René Koering (born 27 May 1940) is a French composer, film producer and theater director. He is particularly known for his involvement in the creation of the Festival de Radio France et Montpellier in 1985.

Life 
Born in Andlau (Bas-Rhin), he participated to the establishment of the Festival de Radio France et Montpellier in 1985. He is the father of the French actress and director .

Awards 
 1967: Prize of the Bleustein-Blanchet Foundation.
 1967: Grand prix of the Fondation Maeght.
 1978: Grand prix of the musique symphonique of the SACEM.
 1990: Grand prix Musique of the Société des auteurs et compositeurs dramatiques.
 1998: Chevalier de l'ordre de la Légion d'honneur, proposed by the Ministère de la culture et de la communication.
 2005: Commandeur des Arts et des Lettres.
 Chevalier de l'Ordre national du Mérite.

References

External links 
 René Koenig on France Musique
 René Koenig on CDMC
 René Koenig on Actes Sud
 René Koering, les ondes de la Maison ronde le font toujours vibrer on Midi Libre
 René Koering on INA
 René Koering met en scène La Flûte enchantée à l'Opéra de Toulon on Opera online

1940 births
Living people
People from Bas-Rhin
20th-century French composers
Chevaliers of the Légion d'honneur
Commandeurs of the Ordre des Arts et des Lettres